St. Thomas Schools is a privately-owned coeducational boarding high school, at Thiruvananthapuram in the south Indian state of Kerala. It is an English Medium School affiliated to the Council for the Indian School Certificate Examinations.

The school was established by the Mar Thoma Church Educational Society (MTCES) on 6 June 1966. It is located on a  campus at Mukkolakkal, a village on the outskirts of Thiruvananthapuram city. There are distinct institutions within the school: St. Thomas Central School, St. Thomas Higher Secondary School, St. Thomas Teachers' Training College, St. Thomas Residential School and St. Thomas Pre-primary School. The students of the St Thomas are popularly called Santhomites.

The campus has three schools inside which offers three different syllabi of examination: Kerala State Board,
Central Board of Secondary Education (CBSE), and Indian Certificate of Secondary Education/Indian School Certificate (ICSE/ISC) 

The school has a vast school bus system which spans over the entire city with more than 33 bus routes. The school is also known as STRS which is an abbreviated form for St.Thomas Residential School.

History
The school was established by the Mar Thoma Church Educational Society (MTCES) of the Malankara Marthoma Syrian Church on 6 June 1966. The first principal of the school was Rev. P.K. Koshy, who served as Principal from 1966 to 1968.
The principals since then were 
 Mr. T.Paul Varghese (1968–72)
 Mr. P.T.Mathew (1972–73)
 Mr. Thomas Mathai (1973–81)
 Mr. Thomas.P.Athyal (1981–88)
 Dr. V.M.John (1988–98)
 Mr. M.M.Mathew (1998-03)
 Mrs. Achamma Zachariah (2003–09)
 Mr. Rajan K Varughese (2009–18)
 Mr. Babykutty P Rajan (2018– )

Campus
Located on the outskirts of Trivandrum city, St. Thomas Schools has a 32-acre campus. The school has a synthetic Turf Tennis court, a hockey field, a football ground, a basketball court cum skating rink, boarding hostels, canteen, and a ground with a 400m running track.

The residential school includes a state-of-the-art Computer facility  and Science labs for the students.

Sanrevo
This is an inter-school cultural fest hosted by the school, which was conceptualized and started by the ISC 2007 batch and is one of the most awaited school fests each year. The final year students, supported by their teachers and their juniors, are the organizers of the event.

The full form of  'Sanrevo' is Santhomite Revolution. The motto for SanRevo 2013 was "Revive. Recreate. Rise." The fabled phoenix is the logo of SanRevo. The phoenix is 'awakened' each year for the fest. Schools from across Trivandrum participate in this annual extravaganza which is eagerly awaited.

The batches of class 11 and 12 in STRS are given special names by the students in the respective batches each year. A list of such batch names has been given below:

Colosseum
In 2009, St. Thomas Central School started the inter school fete, Colosseum. This is also organized by 12th grade students with help from the teachers and juniors. The motto for Colosseum 2k13 was "One Team. One Dream."

Controversy 
Two students of opposite sex were expelled from St Thomas Central school on charge of hugging each other in school premises. Additionally, private Instagram accounts of the students were accessed to provide additional 'evidence' against students. These personal pictures of the two teenagers were described by the school as "indecent, scandalous, highly objectionable lascivious material which appeals to prurient interest." Student's parents approached the Childs Rights Commission and Kerala High Court to move against school's action. The Kerala High Court deemed the action of the school management to be legal and rejected an interim order from the Child Rights Commission that suggested the students be allowed to attend classes. School's stand is that students of opposite sex are not allowed to hug or shake each other's hands to congratulate each other and any such behavior is an act of indiscipline.

Notable alumni
Jassie Gift, Indian film music composer and playback singer
Arun Kumar Aravind, Indian film director, editor and producer
Appu.N.Bhattathiri, Kerala State Film award winning film editor
Mr.Sadeesh Prinjukunju, Complan Boy from 2003-2007

External links
 Official website
 Residential school site

References

Christian schools in Kerala
Boarding schools in Kerala
Primary schools in Kerala
High schools and secondary schools in Thiruvananthapuram
Private schools in Thiruvananthapuram
Educational institutions established in 1966
1966 establishments in Kerala